Dozois is a surname. Notable people with the surname include:

Gardner Dozois (1947–2018), American writer and editor
Paul Dozois (1908–1984), Canadian politician

See also
Dozois Reservoir, reservoir in Quebec, Canada